Maa Abbayi  is a 2017 Indian Telugu-language action thriller film starring Sree Vishnu and Chitra Shukla.

Plot 

Abbayi (Sree Vishnu) is a technical geek and an ethical hacker who leads a normal life and falls in love with his neighbour, Ammudu (Chitra Shukla), until one day his family dies in a bomb blast. Abbayi sets out to revenge the death of his family members. Later Ammudu is also falls for him later with her parents will they both decided to get married. Later he tracks down the terrorists through his hacking skills and 
openly challenges the terrorists head to kill him, and finally, the film ends with Abbayi reveals all the terrorist identities in Public and thrashes there vigorous plans to make blasts again in Hyderabad and kills them in the spot where his family has dead.

Cast 
Sree Vishnu as Abbayi
Chitra Shukla as Ammudu
Y. Kasi Viswanath as Abbayi's father
Sana as Abbayi's mother
Rajitha as Ammudu's mother
Sivannarayana Naripeddi as Ammudu's father

Production 
The venture is helmed by debutante Kumar Vatti, who previously worked as an editor under Marthand K. Venkatesh. On the sets of Solo (2011), Kumar told Sree Vishnu that he would be the lead in his directorial debut. Chitra Shukla was signed to portray the heroine opposite Sree Vishnu. The film is based on a recent incident that occurred in Hyderabad. The film is produced by Balaga Prakash Rao and is scheduled to release on 17 March.

Soundtrack 
The music is composed by Suresh Bobbili. In a review of the soundtrack by The Times of India, the reviewer wrote that "With more than a couple of potential hits, this album is a winner".

Release 
The Hindu gave the film a rating of one out of five stars and wrote that "The film fails in its attempt to be a slick thriller". Similarly, The Times of India gave the film a rating of one-and-a-half out of five stars and stated that "Save yourselves some time and money, by ignoring this one without a second thought".

References

External links 

2017 directorial debut films
 Indian action thriller films
2017 action thriller films
2010s Tamil-language films